General elections were held in Puerto Rico on 4 November 1952. Luis Muñoz Marín of the Popular Democratic Party was re-elected as governor, whilst the PPD also won a majority of the vote in the House of Representatives elections. Voter turnout in the House elections was 72.5%.

Results

Governor

House of Representatives

References

Puerto
General elections in Puerto Rico
Elections
Puerto Rico